Salt Creek Township, Indiana may refer to one of the following places:

 Salt Creek Township, Decatur County, Indiana
 Salt Creek Township, Franklin County, Indiana
 Salt Creek Township, Jackson County, Indiana
 Salt Creek Township, Monroe County, Indiana

See also

Salt Creek Township (disambiguation)
Sand Creek Township, Indiana (disambiguation)

Indiana township disambiguation pages